Marcus Osmond Smart (born March 6, 1994) is an American professional basketball player for the Boston Celtics of the National Basketball Association (NBA). He played college basketball for the Oklahoma State Cowboys.

Smart was drafted with the sixth overall pick in the 2014 NBA draft by the Celtics. He initially came off the bench for the Celtics before starting games regularly in 2018 and becoming the starting point guard in 2021. He was named the NBA Defensive Player of the Year for the 2021–22 season, becoming only the sixth guard in NBA history to win the award. Smart has also been named to the NBA All-Defensive First Team three times and is a two-time NBA Hustle Award winner, winning it in 2019 and 2022. He helped the Celtics reach the NBA Finals in 2022.

Early life
Smart is the son of Billy Frank Smart and Camellia Smart, who died of myelodysplastic syndrome on September 16, 2018. He has three older brothers: Todd Westbrook (deceased), Jeff Westbrook, and Michael Smart. He attended Edward S. Marcus High School in Flower Mound, Texas, along with one of his future Oklahoma State teammates, Phillip Forte. During his senior year, Smart averaged 15.1 points, 9.2 rebounds and 5 assists. In his high school career, he achieved a record of 115–6 through three seasons and was a two-time 5A state champion. He was also named a McDonald's All-American and was an ESPNHS first team All-American. Smart went on to set a new Team USA U18 record for steals over a five-game period when he grabbed 18 during the 2012 FIBA Americas U18 Championships in Brazil.

Smart played youth football until the sixth grade and continues to enjoy playing tennis in his spare time.

Considered a five-star recruit by ESPN.com, Smart was listed as the No. 1 shooting guard and the No. 10 player in the nation in 2012.

College career
During his freshman year at Oklahoma State, Smart led the Cowboys to a 24–8 record and finished third place in the Big 12 behind Kansas and Kansas State. Smart averaged 15.4 points, 5.8 rebounds, and 4.2 assists per game and led the Big 12 in steals, where he recorded 99 and averaged 3.0 per game. Smart and the Cowboys earned a trip to the NCAA Tournament that year, clinching a #5 seed in the Midwest Region. During the first round of the tournament though, the Cowboys were eliminated by the #12 seed Oregon. On April 17, 2013, Smart held a press conference in the student union at OSU and announced that he would not declare for the NBA draft and instead, return to OSU for his sophomore season. His 99 steals set a freshman record in the Big 12.

On November 19, 2013, Smart tied an OSU single game scoring record with 39 points leading his #7 Oklahoma State Cowboys past #11 Memphis. On February 8, 2014, during a game at Texas Tech, Smart shoved a fan in the stands after a verbal altercation in the closing minutes of the game, and received a technical foul. Reports after the game stated that Smart claimed the fan yelled a racial slur at him. At a press conference the following afternoon, Smart would not comment on that element of the altercation, and coach Travis Ford chose not to address it. The fan denied using a racial slur and stated that he called Smart "a piece of crap". Audio from the incident confirmed the fan's account. Smart was subsequently suspended for three games and the fan agreed not to attend any further Texas Tech games during the 2013–14 season. 

Smart was later that year named one of the 30 finalists for the Naismith College Player of the Year. In the first game of the 2014 NCAA tournament, the Cowboys lost to Gonzaga. He finished with 23 points, 13 rebounds, 7 assists and 6 steals, becoming the first player in tournament history to record 20 points, 10 rebounds, 5 assists and 5 steals.

During his two seasons at Oklahoma State, Smart averaged 16.6 points, 5.9 rebounds and 4.5 assists in 33.1 minutes per game.

On April 7, 2014, Smart declared for the NBA draft, forgoing his final two years of college eligibility.

Professional career

Boston Celtics (2014–present)

Early years (2014–16)

On June 26, 2014, Smart was selected with the sixth overall pick in the 2014 NBA draft by the Boston Celtics. He joined the Celtics for the 2014 NBA Summer League, and signed with the team on July 10. In just his fifth NBA game, Smart sprained his left ankle in the Celtics' 101–98 win over the Indiana Pacers on November 7. He underwent an MRI following the game and was ruled out for two to three weeks. After missing ten games with the injury, Smart returned to action on December 3 against the Detroit Pistons. On December 4, he was assigned to the Maine Red Claws of the NBA Development League. He was recalled the next day after playing in Maine's win over the Erie BayHawks. On March 18, 2015, he scored a season-high 25 points in a loss to the Oklahoma City Thunder. On March 21, he was suspended for one game without pay for hitting San Antonio Spurs forward Matt Bonner in the groin the previous night. On May 18, Smart was named to the NBA's All-Rookie Second Team, garnering 142 points in the voting process.

On July 16, 2015, while playing for the Celtics at the 2015 Las Vegas Summer League, Smart dislocated two fingers on his right hand. On November 15, 2015, he scored a career-high 26 points in a 100–85 win over the Oklahoma City Thunder. Between November 22 and December 26, Smart missed 18 games with a lower left leg injury. He returned to action on December 27 against the New York Knicks, scoring six points in 13 minutes off the bench. On January 15, 2016, in a win over the Phoenix Suns, Smart recorded his first career triple-double with 10 points, 11 assists and 11 rebounds, becoming the first Celtics player to record a triple-double off the bench since Art Williams did so in 1971. On January 31, he tied his career high of 26 points in a loss to the Orlando Magic.

First Eastern Conference Finals appearance (2016–17)

On November 9, 2016, Smart scored a then season-high 20 points in a 118–93 loss to the Washington Wizards. On December 25, he scored 15 points and made a tiebreaking 3-pointer with 47 seconds left to help the Celtics claim a 119–114 win over the New York Knicks. On January 7, 2017, he scored a season-high 22 points in a 117–108 win over the New Orleans Pelicans. In Game 3 of the Eastern Conference Finals on May 21, Smart, who started in place of the injured Isaiah Thomas, made seven 3-pointers and scored 27 points to help the Celtics defeat the Cleveland Cavaliers 111–108. Boston were blown out in the first two games of the series and came back from a 21-point deficit in the third quarter of Game 3. They went on to lose the series in five games.

Injuries and first All-Defensive selection (2017–19)
On November 27, 2017, Smart scored a season-high 23 points, making 6 of 9 from 3-point range, in a 118–108 loss to the Detroit Pistons. Smart missed 11 games between January 24 and February 14 after cutting his hand on glass at the team hotel in Los Angeles. On March 16, 2018, he was ruled out for the rest of the regular season with a torn ligament in his right thumb. After missing the Celtics' first four games of the playoffs, Smart returned to the line-up for Game 5 of their first-round series against the Milwaukee Bucks. He came off the bench and had nine points, five rebounds, four assists and three blocks in a 92–87 win, helping the Celtics take a 3–2 lead.

On June 29, 2018, the Celtics tendered a qualifying offer to make Smart a restricted free agent. On July 19, he re-signed with the Celtics to a four-year, $52 million contract. On November 9, he had his first double-double of the season with 13 points and a season-high 10 assists in a 123–115 loss to the Utah Jazz. He missed the end of the regular season and the first round of the playoffs with a left oblique tear. He returned during the second round of the playoffs. Following the season, he was named to the NBA All-Defensive First Team.

Career high in scoring and health problems (2019–21)
On January 19, 2020, Smart dropped a career-high 37 points on the Phoenix Suns. He went 11 for 22 from three in the game, breaking the Celtics record for three pointers in a single game. On March 20, 2020, he was tested positive for COVID-19 after fellow NBA player Rudy Gobert was tested positive eight days prior, which had caused the NBA season to suspend indefinitely. Smart was one of the first NBA players to speak out publicly regarding the concerns of Covid-19 and how the community should not take the disease lightly. On March 29, 2020, Smart was cleared from COVID-19. After the season, he was named to the NBA All-Defensive First Team for the second time.

On April 28, 2021, Smart was suspended for one game without pay for directing threatening language towards a game official.

Defensive Player of the Year and first NBA Finals (2021–present)
On August 16, 2021, the Celtics re-signed Smart to a 4-year, $77 million contract extension. During the summer of 2021, new Celtics coach Ime Udoka named Smart the team's starting point guard; he remained in that role throughout the season and during the Celtics' 2022 playoff run. Both Fox Sports and Deadspin have credited Smart's move to the starting point guard role as a major catalyst for the team's successful 2021–2022 season. On October 14, Smart was suspended for the team's final preseason game due to missing a team flight to Florida. As of February 2022, Smart was the longest-tenured member of the Celtics' team.

Smart was named the 2021–22 NBA Defensive Player of the Year on April 18, 2022, the first guard to win the award since Gary Payton won it in 1996. Smart became the fifth guard in NBA history (alongside Michael Jordan, Gary Payton, Sidney Moncrief, and Alvin Robertson) to win the award. Smart was also named to the NBA All-Defensive First Team, receiving more first-place votes than any other NBA player. 

On May 19, 2022, in Game 2 of the Eastern Conference Finals, Smart recorded a playoff career-high 12 assists along with 24 points, 9 rebounds and 3 steals in a 127–102 win over the Miami Heat to tie the series at 1–1. In Game 7 of the series, Smart logged 24 points, 9 rebounds, 5 assists and 2 steals in a 100–96 victory over the Heat, advancing to the NBA Finals for the first time in his career, and the Celtics' first NBA Finals appearance since 2010. In Game 3 of the Finals, Smart posted 24 points, seven rebounds and five assists in a 116–100 win over the Golden State Warriors. The Celtics took a 2–1 series lead, but eventually lost in 6 games.

Player profile
Smart plays both the point guard and shooting guard positions, but in 2021, was named the team's starting point guard. Smart, at height 6'3" with a 6'9" wingspan, is capable of guarding all five positions, enabling the Celtics to play a switching defense with historic efficiency. 

Smart has earned a reputation as a hustle player. He is known for diving for loose balls and taking charges, and has been nicknamed "The Cobra" as a result. Because of his physicality, quick hands, and elite basketball IQ, many consider Smart to be one of the most versatile and consistent defenders in the NBA.

Although not a high percentage shooter, Smart is aggressive on offense and defense. He often guards opposing players taller than he is, using his physicality to make them uncomfortable and often causing turnovers or missed shots. Over his years in the league, his three-point shooting has improved to the point where he has become a league-average three-point threat. His former teammate, Kemba Walker, describes the energy he brings to the game: "It's exciting. It's energizing. He just gets everybody going. Gets us going, gets the crowd going. Like I said, we just kinda feed off him. He just does so many great things. And propels our defense each and every night."

Career statistics

NBA

Regular season

|-
| style="text-align:left;"|
| style="text-align:left;"|Boston
| 67 || 38 || 27.0 || .367 || .335 || .646 || 3.3 || 3.1 || 1.5 || .3 || 7.8
|-
| style="text-align:left;"|
| style="text-align:left;"|Boston
| 61 || 10 || 27.3 || .348 || .253 || .777 || 4.2 || 3.0 || 1.5 || .3 || 9.0
 
|-
| style="text-align:left;"|
| style="text-align:left;"|Boston
| 79 || 24 || 30.4 || .359 || .284 || .812 || 3.9 || 4.6 || 1.6 || .4 || 10.6
|-
| style="text-align:left;"|
| style="text-align:left;"|Boston
| 54 || 11 || 29.9 || .367 || .301 || .729 || 3.5 || 4.8 || 1.3 || .4 || 10.2
|-
| style="text-align:left;"|
| style="text-align:left;"|Boston
| 80 || 60 || 27.5 || .422 || .364 || .806 || 2.9 || 4.0 || 1.8  || .4 || 8.9
|-
| style="text-align:left;"|
| style="text-align:left;"|Boston
| 60 || 40 || 32.0 || .375 || .347 || .836 || 3.8 || 4.9 || 1.7  || .5  || 12.9
|-
| style="text-align:left;"|
| style="text-align:left;"|Boston
| 48 || 45 || 32.9 || .398 || .330 || .790 || 3.5 || 5.7 || 1.5 || .5 || 13.1
|-
| style="text-align:left;"|
| style="text-align:left;"|Boston
| 71 || 71 || 32.3 || .418 || .331 || .793 || 3.8 || 5.9 || 1.7 || .3 || 12.1 
|- class="sortbottom"
| style="text-align:center;" colspan="2"|Career
| 520 || 299 || 29.8 || .382 || .321 || .780 || 3.6 || 4.5 || 1.6 || .4 || 10.5

Playoffs

|-
| style="text-align:left;"|2015
| style="text-align:left;"|Boston
| 4 || 3 || 22.5 || .483 || .231 || .533 || 2.8 || 1.3 || .3 || .3 || 9.8
|-
| style="text-align:left;"|2016
| style="text-align:left;"|Boston
| 6 || 1 || 32.2 || .367 || .344 || .810 || 4.5 || 3.0 || 1.7 || .8 || 12.0
|- 
| style="text-align:left;"|2017
| style="text-align:left;"|Boston
| 18 || 3 || 29.9 || .351 || .397 || .640 || 4.7 || 4.7 || 1.5 || .9 || 8.6
|- 
| style="text-align:left;"|2018
| style="text-align:left;"|Boston
| 15 || 4 || 29.9 || .336 || .221 || .735 || 3.7 || 5.3 || 1.7 || .7 || 9.8
|-
| style="text-align:left;"|2019
| style="text-align:left;"|Boston
| 2 || 0 || 16.0 || .091 || .091 || .667 || 2.0 || 2.0 || 1.5 || .0 || 3.5
|- 
| style="text-align:left;"|2020
| style="text-align:left;"|Boston
| 17 || 16 || 38.1 || .394 || .333 || .875 || 5.2 || 4.6 || 1.2 || .5 || 14.5
|- 
| style="text-align:left;"|2021
| style="text-align:left;"|Boston
| 5 || 5 || 36.0 || .439 || .372 || .714 || 4.4 || 6.0 || 1.0 || .2 || 17.8
|- 
| style="text-align:left;"|2022
| style="text-align:left;"|Boston
| 21 || 21 || 36.2 || .405 || .350 || .806 || 4.5 || 5.9 || 1.2 || .2 || 15.4
|- class="sortbottom"
| style="text-align:center;" colspan="2"|Career
| 88 || 53 || 32.9 || .383 || .328 || .754 || 4.4 || 4.8 || 1.4 || .5 || 12.3

College

|-
| style="text-align:left;"|2012–13
| style="text-align:left;"|Oklahoma State
| 33 || 32 || 33.5 || .404 || .290 || .777 || 5.8 || 4.2 || 3.0 || .7 || 15.4
|-
| style="text-align:left;"|2013–14
| style="text-align:left;"|Oklahoma State
| 31 || 31 || 32.7 || .422 || .299 || .728 || 5.9 || 4.8 || 2.9 || .6 || 18.0
|- class="sortbottom"
| style="text-align:center;" colspan="2"|Career
| 64 || 63 || 33.1 || .413 || .295 || .751 || 5.9 || 4.5 || 2.9 || .6 || 16.6

References

External links

 Oklahoma State Cowboys bio

1994 births
Living people
2019 FIBA Basketball World Cup players
All-American college men's basketball players
American men's basketball players
Basketball players from Texas
Boston Celtics draft picks
Boston Celtics players
Maine Red Claws players
Oklahoma State Cowboys basketball players
People from Flower Mound, Texas
Point guards
Shooting guards
Sportspeople from the Dallas–Fort Worth metroplex
United States men's national basketball team players